The Malankara Orthodox Syrian Church (MOSC) also known as the Indian Orthodox Church (IOC) or simply as the Malankara Church, is an autocephalous Oriental Orthodox church headquartered in Devalokam, near Kottayam, India. The church serves India's Saint Thomas Christian (also known as Nasrani) population. According to tradition, these communities originated in the missions of Thomas the Apostle in the 1st century (circa 52 AD).  It employs the Malankara Rite, an Indian form of the West Syriac liturgical rite.

The MOSC descends from the Malankara Church and its affiliation with the Syriac Orthodox Church. However, between 1909 and 1912, a schism over the authority of the Syriac Orthodox Patriarch of Antioch's authority resulted in the dissolution of the unified Malankara Church and establishment of the overlapping and conflicting MOSC and Jacobite Syrian Christian Church (JSCC). Since 1912, the MOSC has maintained a catholicate, the Catholicos of the East and Malankara Metropolitan–presently Baselios Marthoma Mathews III–who is the primate of the church. The MOSC drafted and formally adopted a constitution in 1934, wherein the church formally declared the Malankara Metropolitan and the Catholicos of the East as one. The Malankara Orthodox Syrian Church asserts communion with the other Oriental Orthodox churches. However, regular legal and occasional physical confrontations between the MOSC and the Syriac Orthodox JSCC have continued despite multiple efforts to reconcile the churches.

List of Presidents and Managers of Malankara Orthodox Church

This is the list of appointments of new Presidents and Managers  of the Malankara Orthodox Syrian Church as follows, in place of the outgoing Presidents and Managers of various organizations of our Holy Church, as determined by the Holy Episcopal Synod held at the Catholicate Aramana, Devalokam - Kottayam.

List of Metropolitans of Holy Episcopal Synod

This is a list of present metropolitan of the Malankara Orthodox Syrian Church.

List of past Metropolitans

This is a list of past Metropolitan who served the Malankara Orthodox Syrian Church of Malankara Church after and before the establishment of the Catholicate in India.

Notes

See also
List of Malankara Metropolitans
 Malankara Orthodox Syrian Church
 https://mosc.in/holysynod

Religion-related lists
Lists of Oriental Orthodox Christians
Malankara Orthodox Syrian Church bishops